Chancellor State College is a public, co-educational, day school located in the suburb of Sippy Downs, Queensland, Australia.

Chancellor State School opened in 1997. In 2004, it became Chancellor State College offering both primary and secondary education. As of 2017, there are 2889 students from prep through to year 12. Students and staff are spread across two campuses, a Primary on Scholars Drive and a Secondary on Sippy Downs Drive; Either side of the University of the Sunshine Coast.

Chancellor State College has links to the University of the Sunshine Coast.

Achievements 
Chancellor State College has had much success over its years of operations in the academic, sporting and cultural sectors, just to name a few. These successes include those of its RoboKings and RoboGems who were formed as part of the school's STEM program. The college Wind Symphony has also had its fair share of success at events such as Fanfare and Eisteddfod. For the past few years, the school's cross country team and the school's athletics team have had successful runs at their respective district's carnivals.

Principals 
Executive Principals of Chancellor State College have included:
John Lockheart 2004–2008,
Bevan Brennan 2009–2012,
Barry Dittmann 2013,
Glen Robinson 2014,
Peter Kelly 2014–2017,
Darrin Edwards 2017,
Jacqui King 2017,
Leanne Jensen-Steele 2019–present (Acting)

See also 
 List of schools in Queensland

References

External links 
 Chancellor State College Website

Public high schools in Queensland
Schools on the Sunshine Coast, Queensland
Buderim
Educational institutions established in 1997
1997 establishments in Australia